Jaspal Singh (6 June 1968 – 12 November 2015) was an Indian first-class cricketer. He played for Delhi and Punjab.

References

External links
 

1968 births
2015 deaths
Indian cricketers
Delhi cricketers
Punjab, India cricketers
Cricketers from Delhi